Two Inlets Township is a township in Becker County, Minnesota, United States. The population was 237 as of the 2000 census.

History
Two Inlets Township was organized in 1898.  It took its name from Two Inlets Lake.

Geography
According to the United States Census Bureau, the township has a total area of 35.9 square miles (93.1 km), of which 34.1 square miles (88.2 km) is land and 1.9 square miles (4.9 km) (5.23%) is water.

Lakes
 Big Tom Lake
 Boot Lake (southeast quarter)
 Coleman Lake
 Duck Lake
 Fools Lake
 Horseshoe Lake
 Hungry Man Lakes (southwest half)
 Hungry Man Lakes (southwest three-quarters)
 Knights Lake
 Little Mud Lake
 Long Lake
 Mud Lake
 One Acre Lake
 Small Lake
 Stump Lake
 Ten Acre Lake
 Two Inlets Lake
 Wapsi Lake

Adjacent townships
 Savannah Township (north)
 Clover Township, Hubbard County (northeast)
 Arago Township, Hubbard County (east)
 Osage Township (south)
 Carsonville Township (southwest)
 Pine Point Township (west)
 Forest Township (northwest)

Cemeteries
The township contains Saint Mary's Catholic Cemetery.

Demographics
As of the census of 2000, there were 237 people, 89 households, and 67 families residing in the township.  The population density was 7.0 people per square mile (2.7/km).  There were 156 housing units at an average density of 4.6/sq mi (1.8/km).  The racial makeup of the township was 97.47% White, 1.69% Native American and 0.84% Asian.

There were 89 households, out of which 33.7% had children under the age of 18 living with them, 71.9% were married couples living together, 2.2% had a female householder with no husband present, and 23.6% were non-families. 20.2% of all households were made up of individuals, and 12.4% had someone living alone who was 65 years of age or older.  The average household size was 2.66 and the average family size was 3.09.

In the township the population was spread out, with 24.1% under the age of 18, 7.2% from 18 to 24, 25.3% from 25 to 44, 27.8% from 45 to 64, and 15.6% who were 65 years of age or older.  The median age was 40 years. For every 100 females, there were 134.7 males.  For every 100 females age 18 and over, there were 122.2 males.

The median income for a household in the township was $31,429, and the median income for a family was $35,357. Males had a median income of $20,250 versus $16,111 for females. The per capita income for the township was $15,946.  About 6.0% of families and 3.1% of the population were below the poverty line, including none of those under the age of eighteen and 8.6% of those 65 or over.

References
 United States National Atlas
 United States Census Bureau 2007 TIGER/Line Shapefiles
 United States Board on Geographic Names (GNIS)

Townships in Becker County, Minnesota
Townships in Minnesota